DeeExpus is a melodic progressive rock group from Northeast England whose debut album, Half Way Home was released by DXP Productions in 2008, garnering fan buzz and enthusiastic reviews from around the world. In 2009, DeeExpus received the Classic Rock Society's award for "Best New Band" and released their first live CD and DVD Far From Home from their performance at the Progrock 2009 Festival in Katowice, Poland. The band released their follow-up album on 5 December 2011, The King of Number 33, featuring Mark Kelly from Marillion on keyboards with Andy Ditchfield and Nik Kershaw on lead vocal on the track "Memo".
Their music is difficult to categorize, but they have been likened to other contemporary melodic progressive and heavy rock bands Marillion, Dream Theater, It Bites, Porcupine Tree, Tinyfish, Spock's Beard, Edison's Children and Frost*.

Discography
Studio albums
Half Way Home (2008)
The King of Number 33 (2011)

Live albums
Far from Home (2009)

Personnel

Members
Current members
Andy Ditchfield - guitars, keyboards, vocals (2007–present)
Henry Rogers - drums (2010–present)
Michael McCrystal - guitar (2012–present)
Mike Varty - keyboards (2012–present)
David Anderson - bass (2012–present)

Former members
Tony Wright - vocals (2007-2012)
John Dawson - bass (2010-2012)
Mark Kelly - Keyboards (2010-2012)
Marc Jolliffe - Keyboards (2008-2010)

Lineups

References

External links 

English progressive rock groups